Corrida may refer to:
 Bullfight
 Corrida (horse), a racehorse 
 Corrida (Dschinghis Khan album), 1983
 Corrida (Kabát album), 2006